Uchi Veyil is a 1990 Indian Tamil-language drama film directed by Jayabharathi.

Cast 

 Kuppuswamy as Duraiswamy
 Vijay as Shankar
 Srividya
 Delhi Ganesh as Sabhapathy

Production 
Shot in 13 days, Uchi Veyil was directed by Jayabharathi, the screenplay was written by Ravindran Ramamurthy based on a story by Indira Parthasarathy, and produced by T. M. Sundaram under Jwala Film on a shoestring budget of ₹4.8 lakh (worth ₹1.2 crore in 2021 prices) within 8 days. Debutant Kuppuswamy who was 75 years old at that time and was struggling for so many years to become an actor in films was chosen as lead actor of the film.

Cinematography was handled by Ramesh Vyas, and editing by Balu Shankar. The score was composed by L. Vaidyanathan. The film had no songs or star actors.

Release and reception 
The film was screened at the International Film Festival of India at Calcutta, and the Toronto International Film Festival, both in 1990. It was positively received by critics, particularly David Overby and Suze of Variety.

Notes

References

Bibliography

External links 
 
 

1990 films
1990s Tamil-language films
Indian drama films
1990 drama films